Marek Šotola (born 5 November 1999) is a Czech professional volleyball player. He is a member of the Czech Republic national team and the 2022 European League winner. At the professional club level, he plays for Berlin Recycling Volleys.

Honours
 National championships
 2016/2017  Czech Championship, with Jihostroj České Budějovice
 2018/2019  Czech Cup, with Jihostroj České Budějovice
 2018/2019  Czech Championship, with Jihostroj České Budějovice
 2019/2020  Czech Cup, with Jihostroj České Budějovice
 2021/2022  German SuperCup, with Berlin Recycling Volleys
 2021/2022  German Championship, with Berlin Recycling Volleys
 2022/2023  German SuperCup, with Berlin Recycling Volleys
 2022/2023  German Cup, with Berlin Recycling Volleys

Youth national team
 2017  CEV U19 European Championship
 2018  CEV U20 European Championship

Individual awards
 2017: CEV U19 European Championship – Best Opposite Spiker
 2018: CEV U20 European Championship – Best Opposite Spiker

References

External links
 
 Player profile at Volleybox.net

1999 births
Living people
Sportspeople from České Budějovice
Czech men's volleyball players
Czech expatriate sportspeople in France
Expatriate volleyball players in France
Czech expatriate sportspeople in Germany
Expatriate volleyball players in Germany
Opposite hitters